Littlefield is an unincorporated community and census-designated place in Mohave County, Arizona, United States, that is located in the Arizona Strip region. As of the 2020 census, its population was 256, down from 308 in 2010. Littlefield is located in the 86432 ZIP Code.

History
Littlefield was first settled by Latter-day Saints, also known as Mormons, in 1865.

Littlefield is the former home of the Littlefield Unified School District, the geographically largest school district in Arizona. The only remnant of the school district in Littlefield itself is the historic adobe Littlefield Schoolhouse, currently under renovation.

Geography
Littlefield is in the northwest corner of Mohave County (and the state of Arizona), along Interstate 15, with access from Exit 8. It is bordered to the north, across I-15, by the community of Beaver Dam.

Littlefield, Beaver Dam, and Scenic have the distinction of being the only towns in Arizona along I-15. Owing to its location in the Arizona Strip, northwest of Grand Canyon National Park and west of the Virgin River, it is isolated by hundreds of miles from the rest of the state. Travel to other towns within Arizona requires crossing through either Nevada or Utah, or driving on unpaved roads to the rest of Arizona's road network.

Demographics

The city is made up of 72.7 percent Hispanic, 27.3 percent White, 0 percent Black/Asian.

See also

 List of census-designated places in Arizona
 Beaver Dam High School (Beaver Dam, Arizona)
 The Church of Jesus Christ of Latter-day Saints in Arizona

Notes

Census-designated places in Mohave County, Arizona
Populated places established in 1865
History of the Mojave Desert region
1865 establishments in Arizona Territory